Tehran International Book Fair is an annual international book fair held in Tehran, Iran. The event is held in a 120,000 square meter venue at Tehran's Grand Prayer Grounds.

While this event showcases products like humanities, religion, philosophy, literature, social sciences, art and architecture, pure and applied science based books associated with this field etc., the Tehran Book Fair has been criticized by the Anti-Defamation League for its antisemitic and Holocaust denial literature, which notably featured the Russian forgery text of The Protocols of the Elders of Zion and books by white supremacist David Duke. The fair has also been criticized for censoring and banning books by the exiled opposition group the People's Mojahedin of Iran.

See also

Media of Iran
Culture of Iran
Education in Iran
Propaganda in Iran
Censorship in Iran
Antisemitism in Iran
Human rights in Iran
Iran International Exhibitions Company
Intellectual property in Iran
Tabriz International Book Fair

References

External links
Official Website

Book fairs in Iran
Events in Tehran
Tourist attractions in Tehran